December: En svensk jul is a Christmas album by Uno Svenningsson and Irma Schultz Keller, released in 2011.

Track listing
Viskar en bön (Peter Hallström, Mauro Scocco)
Stilla natt (Stille Nacht, Heilige nacht) (Peter Hallström, Mauro Scocco)
När det lider mot jul (Ruben Liljefors, Jeanna Oterdahl)
När julen rullar över världen (Uno Svenningsson, Patrik Frisk)
Jul, jul, strålande jul (Hugo Hammarström, Edvard Evers)
En vinterpromenad (Irma Schultz Keller)
Önskar dig en stilla natt (Bo Kasper)
Stunder av lycka (Uno Svenningsson)
Kom du nånsin iväg (Leonard Cohen, Ulf Lundell)
Ser du stjärnan i det blå (When You Wish Upon a Star) (Leigh Harline, SS Wilson)

Personnel
Uno Svenningsson – vocals
Irma Schultz Keller – vocals
Fredrik Hermansson – keyboard
Andreas Hourdakis – guitar
Lars "Billy" Hansson – production

Charts

References 

2011 Christmas albums
Irma Schultz Keller albums
Uno Svenningsson albums
Christmas albums by Swedish artists
Pop Christmas albums